Robert Gronowski (13 May 1926 – 24 February 1994) was a Polish professional association football player and manager. He spent the majority of his career with Lechia Gdańsk, with whom he also managed for a brief spell after retiring from playing professional football. His brother, Henryk Gronowski was also a former professional footballer who played as a goalkeeper.

Early years

Having been born in Gliwice in 1926, which was then in Germany, Robert was born as Robert Gruner. Unlike his brother Henryk who changed his name to the Polish version of their last name, Gronowski, Robert never officially changed his name and was always known as Robert Gruner throughout his lifetime. However, all footballing records stated his name as Robert Gronowski.

Senior career

After World War 2 Gronowski joined the newly established football team of his birth city Piast in Gliwice, which had now been integrated into Poland. In 1949 Gronowski joined Lechia Gdańsk with his younger brother, Henryk. Gronowski spent a total of 11 years at Lechia, playing over 158 games in all competitions and scored 58 goals in all competitions, still placing as one of the club's highest goalscorers in their history, and is still the club's third highest goalscorer in the Ekstraklasa with 35 goals in the top division. In 1961 Gronowski moved to Australia to play for Polonia Melbourne and Polonia Sydney, Football teams which had been created by Polish nationals who had moved to Australia. During his time with the clubs, Gronowski also acted as the clubs' manager, with the role as a player manager.

International career

In 1953 Gronowski played for Poland, in what turned out to be his only international appearance. He played against Albania in a 2-0 defeat.

Managerial career

After his roles as a player manager in Australia, Gronowski focused solely on management. His first full-time appointment was with Lechia Gdańsk in 1966, meaning his first three management jobs also saw him managing his brother. His time at Lechia didn't last long, and Gronowski soon found himself without a job. After Lechia Gronowski managed SKS Stoczniowiec Gdańsk, RKS Stocznia Północna, and Ogniwo Sopot, all of which are located in the Tricity area.

Personal life

Gronowski is commemorated by a star at the MOSiR Stadium in Gdańsk. The "Avenue of Stars" commemorates the efforts and success of former players and coaches.

References

1926 births
1994 deaths
Sportspeople from Gliwice
Piast Gliwice players
Lechia Gdańsk players
AKS Chorzów players
Polonia Gdańsk players
Polish footballers
Poland international footballers
Polish football managers
Lechia Gdańsk managers
Association football forwards
Western Eagles FC players
Western Eagles FC managers